The 1979 Boston University Terriers football team was an American football team that represented Boston University as a member of the Yankee Conference during the 1979 NCAA Division I-AA football season. In their third season under head coach Rick Taylor, the Terriers compiled an 8–1–1 record (4–1 against conference opponents), tied for the conference championship, and outscored opponents by a total of 209 to 120.

Schedule

References

Boston University
Boston University Terriers football seasons
Yankee Conference football champion seasons
Boston University Terriers football